Foliate is a free e-book reading application for desktop Linux systems.
The name refers to leaves, meaning "(getting) leafy" or "…-leaved".

Features
Foliate focuses on reading and supports book management with a dedicated library view.
It supports typical e-book formats with reflowable text: EPUB (primary focus), Mobipocket, AZW(3), and no formats with fixed layout, although PDF support is being considered.

Its customizable and theme-based user interface is inspired by those of portable e-reader hardware devices. It follows the GNOME standards and automatically adapts to different screen formats.
It is streamlined for distraction-free reading and is described as pleasant and more polished than other free desktop applications.
Books are displayed in a paginated view, with double-page or single-page view depending on screen size, or in a continuous scrolling view, with customizable typeface, spacing/margins, brightness and size/zoom.
Control elements hide with an automatic fading effect while basic navigation with hidden controls is still possible by clicking/tapping on pages or arrow keys.
It has a toggleable navigation sidebar, can display a reading time estimate with a progress slider with chapter markers and supports multi-touch gestures such as pinch zoom.
A full-screen mode and an optional traditional title bar can be activated.
In skeuomorphic mode, Foliate mimicks the look of a traditional paper book.

Foliate can browse the OPDS feed of Project Gutenberg, Standard Ebooks and Feedbooks, and can automatically download royalty free ebooks from these sources. It is also possible to manually add other OPDS sources.

Foliate supports speech synthesis using eSpeak, eSpeakNG or Festival, albeit without automatic detection of the content language. It is also possible to use Google's text to speech service in Foliate.
A full-text search is available (also for annotations), as well as word lookup (in Wikipedia and Wiktionary or offline dictionaries via a dictd interface) and integration of Google Translate.

The application stores reading progress, bookmarks and annotations in a central directory using one JSON file per book. These can be synchronized with other devices, although it uses a format that does not work immediately with other reading software. It can also check for spelling errors in annotations and export them as Markdown.
It is not able to synchronize e-books with a hardware reader device.

Technology
The application is written in JavaScript, based on the JavaScript interpreter GJS, the epub.js library, the rendering engine WebKit and GTK 3 for the user interface. Optionally gspell can be used for spell checking of annotations. Support for the Kindle formats (mobi, azwX) is based on a Python module.
Resource consumption is low.

Distribution
Foliate is published as Free Software, and therefore with its complete source code, under the terms of the GNU General Public License in version 3 or later. It was first published on 26 May 2019 on GitHub.
Binary files are distributed primarily as Flatpak packages via flathub. These can be installed on several major Linux distributions using on-board tools.
It has been included in the default package repositories of several distributions, including Fedora, Arch and OpenSUSE. Additionally, there are Snap packages available through the snap store and a .deb file for Debian-based distributions which can also be installed and updated via a Personal Package Archive under Ubuntu and its siblings. It can be also installed  in an Android phone using Termux and VNC.

External links

 Website
 GitHub page

Sources

References 

EPUB readers
Linux text-related software